The Amiga 3000, or A3000, is a personal computer released by Commodore in June 1990. It is the successor to the Amiga 2000 with more processing speed, improved graphics, and a new revision of the operating system. .

Its predecessors, the Amiga 500, 1000 and 2000, share the same fundamental system architecture and consequently perform without much variation in processing speed despite considerable variation in purchase price. The A3000 however, was entirely reworked and rethought as a high-end workstation. The new Motorola 32-bit 68030 CPU, 68882 math co-processor, and 32-bit system memory increase the integer processing speed by a factor of 5 to 18, and the floating-point processing speed by a factor of 7 to 200 times. The new 32-bit Zorro III expansion slots provide for faster and more powerful expansion capabilities.

In common with earlier Amigas the 3000 runs a 32-bit operating system called AmigaOS. Version 2.0 is generally considered to have a more ergonomic and attractive interface than previous versions, which were designed with television sets as a lowest common denominator display. Access for application developers was simplified.

The A3000UX is an A3000 variant bundled with the UNIX System V operating system. Commodore had a licensing agreement with AT&T to include a port of Unix System V (release 4). Commodore also sold a tower variant called the A3000T.

An enhanced version, the Amiga 3000+, with the AGA chipset and an AT&T DSP3210 signal processing chip was produced to prototype stage in 1991. Although this system was never released, Commodore's negotiations with AT&T over the proper way to bundle their VCOS/VCAS operating system software in a personal computer environment helped Apple Computer deliver their Quadra 660 and Quadra 840 AV-series Macintosh systems, two years later. 
Instead of the Amiga 3000+, Commodore replaced the A3000 six months behind schedule, in the fall of 1992, with the A4000.

Technical information
The Amiga 3000 shipped with a Motorola 68030 at either 16 or 25 MHz and 2 MB of RAM. It includes the Enhanced Chip Set (ECS), a display enhancer for use with a VGA monitor, and a DMA SCSI-II controller and hard disk drive.

"Fast RAM" can be increased by fitting DIP (up to 4 MB) or ZIP DRAM chips (up to 16 MB) available in two varieties, Page Mode or Static Column.

The A3000, unlike most Amiga models, supports both ROM-based Kickstarts and disk-based Kickstarts (the early "SuperKickstart" model), although not simultaneously. Kickstart V1.4 is actually a beta version of Kickstart which is loaded from disk. 68040 microprocessors require at least 2.0 ROMs.

The A3000 has a number of Amiga-specific connectors including two DE-9 ports for joysticks, mice, and light pens, a standard 25-pin RS-232 serial port and a 25-pin Centronics parallel port. As a result, at launch the A3000 was compatible with many existing Amiga peripherals, such as MIDI devices, serial modems, and sound samplers.

The A3000 has four internal 32-bit Zorro III expansion slots. This expansion bus allows the use of devices which comply with the AutoConfig standard, such as graphic cards, audio cards, network cards, and later even USB controllers.

The two passive ISA slots can be activated by use of a bridgeboard, which connects the Zorro and ISA buses. Such bridgeboards typically feature on-board IBM-PC-compatible hardware, including Intel 80286, 80386 or 80486 microprocessors allowing emulation of an entire IBM PC system in hardware. A compatible ISA card may then be installed in the remaining ISA slot.

Specifications

See also

 Amiga models and variants

Notes

References

Amiga